Sarhuja (also known as Barka Sultanpur or Rasulpur)  is a village of Dildarnagar Kamsar located in Zamania tehsil of Ghazipur district, Uttar Pradesh, India. The village have large population of Kamsaar Pathaans.

References

Villages in Ghazipur district